Lake Lois is a lake in the U.S. state of Washington.

Lake Lois was named after Lois McKinney, the daughter of the proprietor of a nearby resort.

References

Lakes of Thurston County, Washington